David D. Awschalom (born 1956 in Baton Rouge, Louisiana, United States) is an American condensed matter experimental physicist. He is best known for his work in spintronics in semiconductors.

Awschalom graduated from the University of Illinois at Urbana–Champaign with a B.Sc. in physics. He received a Ph.D. in experimental physics from Cornell University. He is the Director of the Chicago Quantum Exchange and a Liew Family Professor in Molecular Engineering at the University of Chicago's Pritzker School of Molecular Engineering (PME). He previously served as the Director of the California Nanosystems Institute and was a professor in the Physics Department at the University of California, Santa Barbara as well as an associated faculty member in the Department of Electrical and Computer Engineering. He has a Hirsch number of 96.

Awards and honors 
 elected Fellow of the American Physical Society (1992) 
 Oliver E. Buckley Prize by the American Physical Society (2005)
 Agilent Europhysics Prize by the European Physical Society (2005)
 elected fellow of the American Academy of Arts and Sciences (2006)
 elected member of National Academy of Sciences (2007)
 Turnbull Lectureship Award from the Materials Research Society (2010)
 elected member of National Academy of Engineering (2011)

References

External links
Official Biographical Info
Buckley Prize press release
Europhysics Prize

1956 births
Living people
Grainger College of Engineering alumni
Cornell University alumni
21st-century American physicists
University of Chicago faculty
University of California, Santa Barbara faculty
Members of the United States National Academy of Sciences
Members of the United States National Academy of Engineering
Fellows of the American Academy of Arts and Sciences
Oliver E. Buckley Condensed Matter Prize winners
Fellows of the American Physical Society